Wigney is a surname. Notable people with the surname include:

Brad Wigney (born 1965), Australian cricketer
Gloria Wigney (born 1934), Australian sprinter
Isaac Newton Wigney (1795–1844), English banker and politician
Michael Wigney, Federal Court of Australia judge who ruled in the  Geoffrey Rush defamation case in 2019
Stuart Wigney (born 1969), Australian rules footballer

See also
Winey